Abu Faris abd al-Aziz al-Maghrawi (d. 1605) was a Moroccan poet and the first known author of a qasida written in malhun. He was one of the poets of the court of the Saadian sultan Ahmad al-Mansur (1578–1602). He is still well known in Morocco. His name is preserved in the proverb "Nothing that is long is of interest except the palmtree and al-Maghrawi". One of his best known poems is "Chafett Aïni Ya Raoui".

References
A. A. Dellaï, Chansons de La Casbah' ', p. 12
M. Th.Houtsma, E.J. Brill's First Encyclopaedia of Islam, 1913-1936, p. 603
Saïd El Meftahi, L'art du Melhoun, son histoire, ses richesses  p. 3
Abu Ali al-Ghawthi, Kashf al-Kina an Alat al-Sima'', Algiers 1904, p. 49-93

16th-century Moroccan people
16th-century Moroccan poets
17th-century Moroccan people
17th-century Moroccan poets
Moroccan songwriters

People from Tafilalt